Muradov (masculine) or Muradova (feminine) is a patronymic surname slavicised from the given name Murad. 

The surname may refer to:
Akbar Muradov 
Fuad Muradov
Georgiy Muradov
Musa Muradov
Ruslan Muradov
Rustam Muradov
Shirvani Muradov
Vidadi Muradov (1956-2021), Azerbaijani carpet specialist and academic
Xelîlê Çaçan Mûradov
Rubaba Muradova
Ogulsapar Muradova

See also
Murodov
Muratov (surname)
Muradeli

Patronymic surnames
Turkic-language surnames